Calamodes is a genus of moths in the family Geometridae.

Species
 Calamodes occitanaria (Duponchel, 1829)
 Calamodes subscudularia (Turati, 1919)

References
 Calamodes at Markku Savela's Lepidoptera and Some Other Life Forms
 Natural History Museum Lepidoptera genus database

Boarmiini